The 2019 Lamar Hunt U.S. Open Cup was the 106th edition of the U.S. Open Cup, a knockout cup competition in American soccer. It is the oldest ongoing competition in the United States, and was contested by 84 teams from leagues in the U.S. system.

The 84 entrants included the 21 American clubs from Major League Soccer and 25 non-affiliated American clubs in the USL Championship. The new USL League One entered its six non-affiliated clubs. The qualification tournament, held in 2018 and early 2019, determined seven teams from local amateur leagues. The 10 entrants from the USL League Two and the 14 from the National Premier Soccer League were determined based on results achieved in those leagues in 2018. Finally, beginning this year, the reigning champion of the National Amateur Cup, Milwaukee Bavarian SC, was invited to the tournament.

Houston Dynamo were the defending champions but were eliminated in the round of 16 by Minnesota United FC.

Atlanta United FC won their first Open Cup title, defeating Minnesota United FC 2–1 in the final.

Qualification

Bold: Team still active in the competition.
 $: Winner of $25,000 bonus for advancing the furthest in the competition from their respective divisions. 
 $$: Winner of $100,000 for being the runner-up in the competition.
 $$$: Winner of $300,000 for winning the competition.

Number of teams by state 
A total of 34 states and the District of Columbia are represented by clubs in the Open Cup this year.

States without a team in the Open Cup: Alaska, Delaware, Hawaii, Idaho, Louisiana, Maine, Mississippi, Montana, Nebraska, New Hampshire, North Dakota, Rhode Island, South Dakota, Vermont, West Virginia, and Wyoming.

Brackets 
Host team listed firstBold = winner* = after extra time, = penalty shootout score

Match details
All times local to game site.

First round 
The First round of the Open Cup took place on May 7 and 8.  There were 19 games between eight local qualifiers, 14 NPSL, 10 USL League Two, and 6 USL League One teams. The teams were paired geographically. The pairings were announced on April 10.

Second round 
The Second round was played on May 14 and 15. 22 games were played between the 19 Round 1 winners and 25 USL Championship teams. Each Round 1 pairing was matched to a Championship team, and the six remaining Championship teams were paired against each other. Pairings were made geographically, and announced on April 17.

Third round 
The Third round was played on May 28 and 29. 11 games were played between the winners of Round 2. Pairings were made geographically, and announced on May 14.

Fourth round 
The Fourth round took place on June 11 and 12. The Fourth Round consisted of 16 games between the 11 third round winners and the 21 American MLS teams. The teams were divided into eight regional groups of four, with either one or two third round teams. Pairings were drawn from the eight groups and announced on May 30.

Round of 16 
The Round of 16 took place June 18, 19, and 20. The Round of 16 draw took place on June 13. The Fourth Round winners were divided geographically into four groups and pairings were determined within those groups. A fixed bracket for the rest of the tournament was established.

Quarter-finals 
The quarter-final matches took place on July 10.

Semi-finals 
The semi-finals took place on August 6 and August 7. The hosts of the semi-finals were drawn on July 11.

Final 

The hosts were decided on July 11.

Top goalscorers 

Updated through SF

Broadcasting 
On April 5, 2019, U.S. Soccer announced a 4-year deal with ESPN to broadcast the Open Cup. The entire tournament, from first round to final, will be carried exclusively on the ESPN+ streaming service; in previous years, ESPN networks had only broadcast marquee matches such as the final.

References

External links
  at U.S. Soccer
 TheCup.us, an independent news site covering the U.S. Open Cup

 
U.S. Open Cup
U.S. Open Cup